Beginning on 31 July 2022, tensions between Serbia and Kosovo heightened due to the expiration of the eleven-year validity period of documents for cars on 1 August 2022, between the government of Kosovo and the Serbs in North Kosovo.

Kosovo, which declared independence in 2008, signed an agreement with Serbia in 2011 that concluded on the use of license plates in North Kosovo. This agreement was supposed to change license plates from the ones that were issued by Serbia to neutral ones. The agreement was extended in 2016 and it expired in 2021 after which a crisis occurred and it ended with an agreement that ended the ban of Kosovo-issued license plates in Serbia. After the announcement that Serbian citizens who enter Kosovo will receive entry and exit documents, a number of barricades were formed in North Kosovo on 31 July 2022 but were removed two days later after Kosovo announced that it would postpone the ban on license plates issued by Serbia. In August 2022, unsuccessful negotiations regarding license plates were held, although the ID document dispute was solved.

Kurti declined to postpone the deadline for license plates and instead announced a phased implementation that would last until April 2023. This began in November, and early on in the month, a number of Kosovo Serb police officers, mayors, judges, and Serb List members of parliament resigned from government institutions. Kosovo and Serbia negotiated again in November 2022 and they had found an agreement on 23 November 2022 which settled that license plates that Serbia issued would continue to be in use in North Kosovo. In December 2022, Serbia submitted a request to Kosovo Force for the deployment of up to 1,000 Serbian military and police forces in Kosovo, which ended up being rejected in January 2023. Another number of barricades were set up in North Kosovo on 10 December; they were dismantled on 30 December. In Serbia, far-right groups staged protests in support of Kosovo Serbs. Kosovo formally signed an application to seek candidate status for European Union membership on 14 December 2022.

Background 

In 1991, Kosovo Albanians proclaimed the establishment of the Republic of Kosova, with Albania only recognizing it as an independent state. The aftermath of the Kosovo War led to the United Nations establishing a governance in Kosovo and NATO establishing the Kosovo Force (KFOR). Kosovo then proclaimed independence from Serbia in 2008; Serbia did not recognize its independence. North Kosovo, a majority Serb region in Kosovo, is also largely opposed to independent Kosovo and prior to the 2013 Brussels Agreement it refused to acknowledge and recognize its independence; in a 2012 referendum, 99% of voters in North Kosovo, with a 75% turnout, rejected the institutions of Kosovo, although the referendum was rejected by Serbia and Kosovo. According to the Brussels Agreement, the Community of Serb Municipalities was to be formed by 2016, although the government of Kosovo froze the deal in 2015, with the Constitutional Court declaring it as unconstitutional.

An agreement between Serbia and Kosovo was concluded on the use of license plates in 2011. Up to that point, Serbia issued Serbian license plates for North Kosovo, although after the agreement the license plates were changed to neutral ones. This agreement was extended in 2016 and was valid until September 2021. After the expiration of the agreement, a crisis occurred and it lasted until October 2021 when another agreement was reached, which effectively ended the ban of Kosovar license plates in Serbia. This agreement was initially intended to be temporary, although in April 2022, the agreement was extended for a further period.

Timeline

2022

July 
A number of Kosovo Serb civilians in North Kosovo began forming barricades on 31 July after the announcement that citizens of Serbia who enter Kosovo will receive documents for entry and exit. This led to KFOR sending troops to patrol the streets, while the Kosovo Police ended up closing the border crossings at Jarinje and Brnjak. Nikola Selaković, then-minister of foreign affairs of Serbia, claimed that Albin Kurti, the prime minister of Kosovo, was "preparing hell in the coming days" for Serbs who live in Kosovo. It was also reported that air raid sirens were turned on in Zubin Potok and North Mitrovica. Roads were blocked near Jarinje and Brnjak border crossings.

Later that day, the ministry of defence of Serbia stated that "the Serbian Army did not cross the border into Kosovo", amid reports that it did enter Kosovo. Aleksandar Vučić, the president of Serbia, also stated that he would want the ban to be postponed. He added that "if they don't want to keep the peace, Serbia will win"; Kurti accused Vučić and Petar Petković, the director of the office for Kosovo and Metohija, for being responsible for the unrest. According to the government of Serbia, one Serb was wounded at the Jarinje border crossing, although the government of Kosovo denied that and stated that only some shooting occurred. Additionally, one gunman also fired on the Kosovo Police.

August 

After negotiations with the diplomatic representatives of the United States and the European Union, the government of Kosovo announced on 1 August that it would temporarily postpone the ban on license plates that were issued by Serbia, after stating the decision a day prior. This agreement was welcomed by Josep Borrell, the high representative of the Union for Foreign Affairs and Security Policy, and Miroslav Lajčák, the European Union Special Representative for the Belgrade-Pristina dialogue. On the same day, Balkan Insight reported that social media users spread disinformation about a "full-scale war". A day later, KFOR confirmed that the barricades that were put up on 31 July were removed, after which the border crossing was opened again for use.

The Kosovo Police reported that one of their patrols was attacked with fire on 6 August near the border. Opposition political parties in Kosovo accused Kurti of "scaring investors about a possible new conflict with Serbia"; Kurti denied the accusations and instead blamed Russia and Vladimir Putin, accusing them of spreading disinformation. At a joint news conference and negotiations with Kurti and Vučić, Jens Stoltenberg, the secretary general of NATO, stated that "NATO urges restraint but stands ready to intervene if needed". A day later, Borrell met with Kurti and Vučić; Borrell stated that the meeting ended without an agreement, but that the talks would also resume in the following days. On 19 August, NATO deployed further KFOR forces in North Kosovo for peacekeeping purposes. Additionally, Vučić stated that KFOR forces should "do their job" and vowed to "defend Kosovo Serbs if NATO failed to do so".

Borrell announced that the ID document dispute was settled on 27 August. It was announced that Serbia agreed to abolish entry and exit documents for Kosovo ID holders while Kosovo committed to refrain from implementing such measures for Serbian ID holders. Vučić stated that he was "very happy that we found a solution", while Igor Simić, the vice president of the Serb List, stated that "this was the victory of Serbian diplomacy". Kurti also praised the agreement, but received criticism from opposition parties in Kosovo due to allegedly continuing the policy of his opponent Hashim Thaçi. Political parties in Serbia, such as the People's Party (Narodna) and Dveri, criticized the agreement.

September 
The agreement, which was signed on 27 August, started being implemented on 1 September. Ana Brnabić, the prime minister of Serbia, visited North Mitrovica on 5 September where she met with representatives of the Serb List. During her speech, she stated that she would be willing to "compromise in the interest of peace and stability". On the same day, Emmanuel Macron, the president of France, and Olaf Scholz, the chancellor of Germany, urged Vučić and Kurti to "move past differences at a moment of crucial importance for security". In a speech to the National Assembly of Serbia on 13 September, Vučić stated that "a realistic solution should be offered for Kosovo, but Serbia will not recognize its independence".

A proposed agreement that was sent by Lajčák,  and Emmanuel Bonne, associates of Scholz and Macron respectively, was leaked on 19 September. A day later, NATO announced that it would send more KFOR forces in case of new tensions. The ministry of internal affairs of Kosovo confirmed on 21 September that cars with license plates that were issued by Serbia will be considered to be unregistered after 1 November.

October 
In early October, Kosovo and Serbia confirmed the existence of the proposed agreement. Vučić stated that according to the proposed agreement, Kosovo would receive membership in the United Nations, while Serbia in exchange would receive a sped up accession to the European Union. Radio Free Europe disputed this claim and instead claimed that the agreement includes "development of good relations on the basis of equal rights, recognition of national symbols, special arrangement for the Serb community and the Serbian Orthodox Church in Kosovo, deepening cooperation at all levels, an agreement on all prior agreements and that Serbia will not oppose Kosovo's membership in any international organization". Osmani stated that the proposed agreement is "a good basis for talks" but that "we never said that the document as such without any changes can be acceptable for Kosovo". The media has dubbed the agreement as "German-French proposal".

Gabriel Escobar, the U.S. State Department special envoy for the Balkans, stated on 20 October that Kosovo should postpone the deadline. Goran Rakić, the leader of the Serb List, met with Vučić on 27 October. During a press conference, Rakić stated that "if Kosovo starts enforcing the confiscation of vehicles and license plates, we will use all means against it" but assured that "all democratic and peaceful means" would be only used. Kurti declined to postpone the deadline, although on 28 October he announced a phased implementation of the change of license plates up to 21 April. He also added that cars with license plates that were issued by Serbia will be "reprimanded, then fined, and then forced to attach probationary plates to their cars".

November 

The phased implementation began on 1 November. A day later, Nenad Đurić, the director of the Regional Police Directorate for North Kosovo, stated that the police in North Kosovo would not implement the decision on the re-registration of license plates that were issued by Serbia to the ones that are issued by Kosovo. On 5 November, hundreds of Kosovo Serb police officers, mayors, judges, and Serb List members of parliament withdrew from government institutions in protest. In response, Kurti, Borrell, and Christopher R. Hill, the United States ambassador to Serbia, stated that "withdrawing is not the answer to the crisis", while Vučić accused Kurti of ignoring the Brussels Agreement; Kurti stated three days prior that the "Community of Serb Municipalities" does not exist. On 6 November, a protest that was organized by the Serb List was held in North Mitrovica. Mass resignations of Kosovo Serbs continued to take place after the resignations on 5 November, after which Kurti accused Serbia of "trying to destabilize Kosovo". As a response, NATO deployed more KFOR peacekeeping troops.

Ivica Dačić, now-minister of foreign affairs of Serbia, stated on 6 November that the proposed agreement is "unacceptable" and claimed that the agreement "starts from the position that Kosovo is independent". Kurti and Vučić met with Macron and Borrell in France on 11 November where they discussed about the crisis. Borrell said that Kurti and Vučić did not reject the proposed agreement and that Kosovo Serbs should return to the government institutions, while he also urged Kurti to form the Community of Serb Municipalities. Vučić also accused Germany and United Kingdom of allegedly backing Kurti. Following the meeting, Osmani announced that local elections will be held in four municipalities in North Kosovo in December 2022; the election was later postponed to April 2023. Kurti and Vučić met again with Lajčák and Borrell to discuss about the implementation of license plates on 21 November. They failed to reach an agreement, although Kurti soon after announced that he had accepted the proposal from the United States to postpone the application of the measure to punish car owners who have not changed license plates that were issued by Serbia for two days. A day later, another series of talks were held during which an agreement between Kosovo and Serbia was reached. Borrell stated that Kosovo and Serbia would now "concentrate on normalizing their relations", while Petković, who was one of the negotiators, stated that license plates that were issued by Serbia would continue to be in use in North Kosovo. On the same day, two anti-government protests were held in North Mitrovica and Gračanica.

Amidst the crisis, the ministry of defence of Serbia claimed that "several drones have entered Serbian airspace from Kosovo over past three days" on 2 November. Vučić ordered to "eliminate" any drones that enter the Serbian airspace and placed the Serbian Army on "high alert". The ministry of defence of Serbia also claimed that a "commercial drone" was destroyed near army barracks in Raška, although Armend Mehaj, the minister of defence of Kosovo, denied that any drones from Kosovo entered the Serbian airspace.

December 

Kurti appointed Nenad Rašić as the minister of communities and returns on 1 December, a position which was held by Rakić until his resignation on 5 November. Serb List claimed that his appointment was "unconstitutional", while Vučić called Rašić the "worst Serbian scum" during a press conference. During the EU-Western Balkans summit in Tirana on 6 December, Vučić and Osmani received an updated version of the proposed agreement. Additionally, Osmani officially announced that Kosovo would apply to join the European Union in December 2022; Kosovo formally signed an application to seek the candidate status for European Union membership on 14 December, with Vučić claiming that Kosovo violated the Washington Agreement by signing the application.

On 8 December, Petković stated that Serbia would consider deploying 1,000 Serbian military forces to Kosovo, citing content of the Article 4 and Annex 2, Article 6 of the United Nations Security Council Resolution 1244, due to claims that the Regional Operational Support Unit (ROSU) allegedly raided North Mitrovica. The government of Kosovo denied that ROSU entered North Mitrovica, stating that "it was the police, and not some other unit". On the same day, Kosovo Police reported that a group of armed people attacked one of their police officers. A day later, Brnabić agreed with Petković and accused KFOR of "failing to protect Serbs" from an alleged harassment of Kosovo Serbs. Osmani described the consideration as "an act of aggression". On 10 December, Vučić stated that he will send a request to KFOR in order to deploy military and police forces in Kosovo, although he also added that he "knows that this request will be rejected". Escobar stated on 13 December that "the United States is against Serbia sending military forces to Kosovo". Serbia sent a request to KFOR for the deployment of 1,000 Serbian military and police forces on 16 December. A number of barricades began forming after an arrest of Dejan Pantić, a former police officer of Serb ethnicity, on the same day. It was reported that the barricades were seen at Leposavić and Zvečan and that air raid sirens were also turned on. Kosovo Police then announced that border crossings at Jarinje and Brnjak would be closed. Xhelal Sveçla, the minister of internal affairs of Kosovo, stated that Pantić was one of the suspects who attacked police officers in the days preceding the formation of the barricades; Pantić was sentenced to a house arrest on 28 December. A day later, a stun grenade was thrown at a car that belonged to the European Union Rule of Law Mission in Kosovo (EULEX), although there were no reported injuries. Borrell and NATO condemned the attack, with Borrell also stating that the barricades should be removed. On the same day, Kurti asked KFOR to guarantee "freedom of movement" after accusing demonstrators of blocking the roads, while Vučić vowed to "maintain peace". The protests remained peaceful while schools in North Kosovo were temporarily closed.

An ultranationalist protest in support of Kosovo Serbs was held in Belgrade on 12 December; demonstrators chanted slogans such as "Kosovo is Serbia" and burned Kosovo flags. The protest was attended by far-right groups such as Dveri, People's Patrol, and Serbian Right. On the same day, Borrell announced that the European Union would reinforce EULEX, which is tasked with patrolling North Kosovo. After a meeting with Kurti on 13 December, Lajčák said that the "barricades should be removed with a political agreement, rather than with bulldozers", while Escobar said that he expects an agreement regarding the Community of Serb Municipalities. People's Patrol and other far-right groups staged another protest on 18 December, although this time at the Jarinje border crossing. The demonstrators were stopped by KFOR after they tried to go through the border crossing. Kosovo Serbs organized a mass protest near Zvečan on 22 December. At the protest, Rakić demanded the government to "release all arrested Serbs and to withdraw the Kosovo Police from North Kosovo". A shooting occurred on 25 December at Zubin Potok after Kosovo Police allegedly attempted to remove barricades from a nearby road; Kosovo Police denied this, however KFOR confirmed that some shooting did occur near their patrols. Shortly after, more barricades were formed near North Mitrovica and the Merdare border crossing, while Miloš Vučević, the minister of defence of Serbia, announced that Serbian Army forces were put up "on the highest level of alert", with the order coming from Vučić. Due to the barricades, the government of Kosovo closed the Merdare border crossing on 28 December. A day later, Kosovo Serbs agreed to start dismantling the barricades after an agreement that was reached a day prior; they were removed by 30 December. Caroline Ziadeh, the head of UNMIK, welcomed this decision, while the "increased combat readiness" of the Serbian Army forces was also abolished. Border crossings were also re-opened.

2023

January 
On 8 January, it was announced that KFOR declined Serbia's request to deploy up to 1,000 Serbian military and police forces in Kosovo. Kurti and Osmani met with Derek Chollet, the counselor of the United States Department of State, on 11 January, and two days later, Chollet met with Vučić. Chollet stated that "Serbia and Kosovo should normalize relations" and that "in the end, Serbia will have to recognize some of Kosovo's sovereignty", while "Kosovo should give ethnic Serbs more autonomy". After consultations on 20 January, Lajčák, Escobar, Plötner, Bonne, and Francesco Talo, the diplomatic advisor to prime minister of Italy Giorgia Meloni, expressed their support for the "French-German proposal", while Lajčák commented that the "formation of the Community of Serb Municipalities is crucial". On 23 January, the Kosovo Police shot at a car on the Mitrovica-Leposavić highway, wounding one Serb; Kosovo Police claimed that the car previously "hit a police car, putting the life of a police officer in direct danger".

February 
After negotiations with Lajčák on 6 February, Kurti announced that he would accept the French-German proposal, stating that "it would be a good basis for further negotiations". Additionally, Kurti stated that "the formation of the Community of Serb Municipalities will be only possible after mutual recognition from Serbia".

Reactions 
In early August, Edi Rama, the prime minister of Albania, commented on the tensions that occurred on 31 July and stated that Kosovo should join the Open Balkan economic and political zone in order to avoid potential war; this was later echoed by Hill. Maria Zakharova, the spokeswoman of the ministry of foreign affairs of Russia, accused Kosovo Albanians of escalating the conflict, while Dmitry Peskov, the Kremlin press secretary, stated that Russia demands that "all rights of Serbs to be respected". Later in December, Peskov said that "Russia supports Belgrade in the actions that are being taken". Richard Grenell, the special presidential envoy for Serbia and Kosovo Peace Negotiations under the administration of Donald Trump, stated that he was disappointed with the progress of the negotiations.

After the leak of the proposed agreement in late September 2022, Dušan Janjić from the Belgrade Forum for Ethnic Relations stated that the agreement is about "putting the dialogue exclusively on a political level", while Bodo Weber, a journalist and political analyst, stated that the agreement "might change the flow of the dialogue" but he also assessed that "Kosovo and Serbia are still far from a final agreement". Milorad Dodik, the president of Republika Srpska, stated that the Republika Srpska, an entity of Bosnia and Herzegovina, is "ready to help the Serbian people in Kosovo, even beyond its capacity". Later in January 2023, Dodik praised Vučić regarding his role in the crisis and stated that "Serbia should never recognize Kosovo". Weber described the mass resignation of Kosovo Serbs from Kosovo institutions as "the crisis as a consequence of the de facto absence of negotiations". Konrad Clewing, an expert for the Leibniz Institute for Eastern and Southeastern European Research, stated that the mass resignation could create "huge consequences".

After the announcement that Serbia would consider deploying 1,000 Serbian military forces to Kosovo, Deutsche Welle stated that the request to deploy is possible according to Resolution 1244, although observers noted that the deployment would be "futile because it would lead to a direct confrontation with the international police and military units stationed in Kosovo". Radio Free Europe stated that according to the Resolution 1244, Serbian personnel could return and perform certain functions in Kosovo, although these functions only include connection with the international civilian mission and international security presence, clearing minefields, maintaining a presence at Serbian cultural heritage sites and at main border crossings. Analysts also stated that the request would most likely be declined. Boris Tadić, former president of Serbia, criticized the government of Serbia and stated that Petković and Brnabić "misled the public", while Momir Stojanović, the former head of the Military Security Agency, said that the return of Serbian forces to Kosovo is "impossible". Rama described it as a "surreal move". Janjić stated that "it is not illegal to consider doing this" but that "in this case it is not desirable", while Ivo Visković, a diplomat and former professor at the Faculty of Political Sciences at the University of Belgrade, stated that "now is the time when diplomacy should work". Additionally, the United States and Peter Stano, the spokesperson of the European Union, asked for de-escalation.

In January 2023, politicians and political parties in Serbia voiced their reactions regarding the French-German proposal. Tadić claimed that the proposal would allow Kosovo to join the United Nations even if it is not explicitly mentioned in the proposal. Narodna, Dveri, National Democratic Alternative, and Serbian Party Oathkeepers have called for the rejection of the proposal. The Party of Freedom and Justice, Democratic Party, and Do not let Belgrade drown have called for Vučić to reveal the content of the proposal to the public. In Kosovo, publicist Veton Surroi assessed that "these negotiations are the most serious since the Ahtisaari Plan", while Avdullah Hoti, the former prime minister of Kosovo, stated that "relations with the United States are of existential importance to Kosovo".

See also 
 North Kosovo crisis (2011–2013)
 2021 North Kosovo crisis

Explanatory notes

References 

North Kosovo crisis
Kosovo–Serbia relations
2022 in international relations
2022 in Kosovo
2023 in Kosovo
2022 protests
July 2022 events in Serbia
August 2022 events in Europe
September 2022 events in Serbia
October 2022 events in Europe
November 2022 events in Europe
December 2022 events in Europe
January 2023 events in Europe
February 2023 events in Europe